Art and Scholasticism is a 1920 book by the French philosopher Jacques Maritain. It is considered his major contribution to aesthetics. According to Gary Furnell, the work "was a key text that guided the work of writers such as Allen Tate, Caroline Gordon, Sally and Robert Fitzgerald, Francois Mauriac, Thomas Merton, John Howard Griffin, Flannery O’Connor and T.S. Eliot." Maritain's Thomist-Aristotelian distinction between Art and Prudence was highly influential on the sculptor Eric Gill, and were developed further in the seminal essay on theological aesthetics, entitled 'Art and Sacrament', by poet and painter David Jones.

References

Bibliography
Books

 

Journals

  

1920 non-fiction books
Aesthetics books
Books by Jacques Maritain
French non-fiction books